Fernanda Melchionna e Silva (born 2 February 1984) is a Brazilian politician and former bank clerk and librarian. She has spent her political career representing the state of Rio Grande do Sul, having served as federal deputy representative since 2019.

Personal life
Melchionna became involved in politics at the age of 13, when along with her parents, she protested the neo-liberal policies and privatization of business of then president of Brazil Fernando Henrique Cardoso.

Prior to becoming a politician Melchionna worked as a bank clerk. She also has a degree in librarianship from the Federal University of Rio Grande do Sul.

Political career
Melchionna was the most voted candidate in the 2016 election for the council of Porto Alegre, receiving 14,630 votes. Melchionna and her family were originally members of the Workers' Party, but she left after being dissatisfied with the politics of Lula da Silva.

In the 2018 election Melchionna was the tenth most voted candidate in the state of Rio Grande do Sul, being elected to the federal chamber of deputies.

References

1984 births
Living people
People from Alegrete
Brazilian bankers
Brazilian librarians
Women librarians
Workers' Party (Brazil) politicians
Socialism and Liberty Party politicians
Members of the Chamber of Deputies (Brazil) from Rio Grande do Sul
Members of the Legislative Assembly of Rio Grande do Sul
Brazilian women in politics

Brazilian feminists